The current Spanish constitution refers to the monarchy as "the Crown of Spain" and the constitutional title of the monarch is simply rey/reina de España: that is, "king/queen of Spain". However, the constitution allows for the use of other historic titles pertaining to the Spanish monarchy, without specifying them. A decree promulgated 6 November 1987 at the Council of Ministers regulates the titles further, and on that basis the monarch of Spain has a right to use ("may use") those other titles appertaining to the Crown. Contrary to some belief, the long titulary that contains the list of over 20 kingdoms is not in state use, nor is it used in Spanish diplomacy. In fact, it has never been in use in that form, as "Spain" was never a part of the list in the pre-1837 era when the long list was officially used.

Spain, mentioned differently in the titulary depending on which monarch was reigning, was for more than three centuries also symbolized by the long list that started "... of Castile, León, Aragón, ..." The following long titulary in the feudal style was the last used officially in 1836 by Isabella II of Spain (see the account of titulary in her article) before she became constitutional queen.

Isabella I of Castile and Ferdinand II of Aragon were together described as the Catholic Monarchs of Spain. The first king to officially use a derivation of the name "Spain" as the realm in the titulary was Charles I of Spain, who used Rex Hispaniarum et Indiarum (i.e. King of the Spains and the Indies). This title was often used after his title of Holy Roman Emperor which was superior to that of king. During his brief and controversial occupancy of the throne Joseph Bonaparte, brother of Emperor Napoleon, also used a similar title, King of the Spains and the Indies, he conferred the title "Prince of Spain" to be hereditary on his children and grandchildren in the male and female line.

During the first restoration of the Bourbons, it returned to the traditional format ("of Castile, Leon, Aragon, ...") until 1837, when the short version "queen of the Spains" was taken into use by Isabella II. The singular Spain was first used by Amadeo—he was "by divine grace and will of nation, king of Spain". During the second restoration, King Alfonso XII started to use "constitutional king of Spain, by divine and constitutional grace".

With the third restoration of the royal house of Spain, current , the monarch uses the simple title "King of Spain", without any divine, national or constitutional reference.

Juan Carlos I, king until June 2014, did not use the style of Catholic Majesty and the other titles and honours, but did not relinquish them.

Titles associated with the Spanish Crown

The titles used by the last Habsburg king of Spain, Charles II, were:

The title used by the first Bourbon (Bourbon-Anjou branch of the house of House of Capet ) king of Spain, King Philip V of Spain, was:

Don Philip, By the Grace of God, King of Castile, of León, of Aragon, of the Two Sicilies, of Jerusalem, of Navarre, of Granada, of Toledo, of Valencia, of Galicia, of Mallorca, of Seville, of Sardinia, of Cordóba, of Corsica, of Murcia, of Jaen, of the Algarves, of Algeciras, of Gibraltar, of the Canary Islands, of the East and West Indies, of the Islands and Mainland of the Ocean Sea, Archduke of Austria, Duke of Anjou, of Burgundy, of Brabant and of Milan, Count of Habsburg, of Flanders, of Tyrol and of Barcelona, Lord of Biscay and of Molina, etc.

The Kingdoms
 King of Spain
 King of Asturias
 King of Castile
 King of León
 King of Aragon
 King of Jerusalem
 King of Cyprus
 King of Navarre
  King of Pamplona
 King of Granada
 King of Mallorca
 King of Toledo
 King of Seville
 King of Valencia
 King of Galicia
 King of Sardinia
 King of Cordoba
 King of Corsica
 King of Menorca
 King of Murcia
 King of Jaén
 King of the Algarves
 King of Algeciras
 King of Gibraltar
 King of the Canary Islands
 King of the Spanish East and West Indies and of the Islands and Mainland of the Ocean Sea

Archduchies
 Archduke of Austria

Duchies
 Duke of Burgundy
 Duke of Brabant
 Duke of Limburg
 Duke of Lothier
 Duke of Milan
 Duke of Luxembourg
 Duke of Athens
 Duke of Neopatria

Counties
 Count of Habsburg
 Count of Flanders
 Count of Burgundy
 Count of Hainaut
 Count of Namur
 Count of Artois
 Count of Charolais
 Count of Tyrol
 Count of Roussillon
 Count of Cerdanya
 Count of Barcelona
 Count of Girona
 Count of Osona
 Count of Besalú
 Count of Covadonga

Lordships
 Lord of Biscay
 Lord of Molina

Other titles maintained, but usually abbreviated with "etc."

Because of the large number of titles associated with the Spanish Crown, only the most important were written, finishing the list with "etc." or "&c.", referring to minor or obsolete titles. These titles are:
King of Hungary, of Dalmatia and of Croatia;
Duke of Limburg, of Lotharingia, of Luxemburg, of Gelderland, of Styria, of Carniola, of Carinthia, and of Württemberg;
Landgrave of Alsace;
Prince of Swabia;
Palatine Count of Burgundy;
Count of Artois, of Hainaut, of Namur, of Gorizia, of Ferrette, of Haut-Rhin, and of Kyburg;
Marquis of Oristano, and of Goceano;
Margrave of the Holy Roman Empire, and of Burgau;
Lord of Salins, of Mechelen, of the Slovenian March, of Pordenone, and of Tripoli.
Andreas Palaiologos, the last legal heir to the throne of the Byzantine Empire designated Ferdinand II of Aragon and Isabella I of Castile, as his heirs at his death in 1502. However, neither Ferdinand nor Isabella, nor any succeeding monarch of Spain, ever used the title.
Rex Catholicissimus

Military rank
: Captain General of the Spanish Armed Forces

Hereditary orders of Spain

Sovereign Grand Master of the Celebrated Order of the Golden Fleece
Grand Master of the Royal & Distinguished Order of Charles III
Grand Master of the Royal Order of Isabel, the Catholic
Grand Master of the Royal and Military Order of Saint Ferdinand
Grand Master of the Royal and Military Order of Saint Hermenegild
Grand Master of the Order of Montesa
Grand Master of the Order of Alcántara
Grand Master of the Order of Calatrava
Grand Master of the Order of Santiago
Grand Master of the Order of Queen Maria Luisa

Titles of the heir apparent or heir presumptive

Titles and styles are listed in order of degrees of rank, nobility, and honor:

Principalities
 Prince of Asturias—title of the first-in-line to the Kingdom of Spain and earlier Crown of Castile-León
 Prince of Girona—title of the first-in-line of the Crown of Aragon
 Prince of Viana—title of the first-in-line of the Kingdom of Navarre

Duchy, county and lordship
 Duke of Montblanc—title of the first-in-line to the Principality of Catalonia
 Count of Cervera—title of the first-in-line to the Kingdom of Valencia
 Lord of Balaguer—title of the first in line to the Kingdom of Mallorca

Orders of the heir apparent 

The following orders are traditionally granted to the heir apparent:
Knight of the Celebrated Order of the Golden Fleece
Knight of the Collar of the Royal and Distinguished Order of Charles III
Knight Grand Cross of the Royal and Military Order of San Hermenegildo
Commandeur-Major of Castile of the Order of Santiago
Knight of the Order of Alcántara
Knight of the Order of Calatrava
Knight of the Order of Montesa

Royal titles

Duchies
Cádiz
Seville
Segovia
Badajoz
Soria
Lugo
Palma de Mallorca

Counties
Chinchón
Molina
Montemolín
Montizón
Barcelona
Covadonga

See also
Imperator totius Hispaniae
Spanish monarchy
List of titles and honours of Juan Carlos I of Spain
List of titles and honours of Queen Sofía of Spain
List of titles and honours of Felipe VI of Spain
List of titles and honours of Queen Letizia of Spain
List of titles and honours of Leonor, Princess of Asturias

Notes

References

 Monarchy